Rauno Miettinen (born 25 May 1949 in Kuopio) is a Finnish former Nordic combined skier. He earned a silver in the individual event at the 1972 Winter Olympics in Sapporo.

Miettinen also won three Nordic combined silver medals in the FIS Nordic World Ski Championships (Individual: 1978, 3 x 10 km team: 1982 (tied with Norway), 1984).

His biggest success as a Nordic combined athlete was at the Holmenkollen ski festival, where he won the event five times (1969, 1971–1973, 1978). Miettinen is one of only four people to win the Holmenkollen Nordic combined five times (the others being Lauritz Bergendahl, Johan Grøttumsbråten, and Bjarte Engen Vik).

Miettinen was awarded the Holmenkollen medal in 1972 (shared with Magne Myrmo).

References

Holmenkollen medalists - click Holmenkollmedaljen for downloadable pdf file 
Holmenkollen winners since 1892 - click Vinnere for downloadable pdf file 

1949 births
Nordic combined skiers at the 1972 Winter Olympics
Nordic combined skiers at the 1976 Winter Olympics
Nordic combined skiers at the 1980 Winter Olympics
Nordic combined skiers at the 1984 Winter Olympics
Ski jumpers at the 1972 Winter Olympics
Ski jumpers at the 1976 Winter Olympics
Finnish male Nordic combined skiers
Finnish male ski jumpers
Holmenkollen medalists
Holmenkollen Ski Festival winners
Living people
Olympic silver medalists for Finland
Olympic Nordic combined skiers of Finland
Olympic ski jumpers of Finland
People from Kuopio
Olympic medalists in Nordic combined
FIS Nordic World Ski Championships medalists in Nordic combined
Medalists at the 1972 Winter Olympics
Sportspeople from North Savo
20th-century Finnish people